Forsa may refer to:

Places
 Forsa Court District, an administrative district of Hälsingland in Sweden
 , a community in Hälsingland, Sweden
 Forsa (Gotland), on Gotland, an island and province of Sweden
 Forssa, a municipality of Tavastia Proper, Finland

Other
 Forsa Institute, a German market research and opinion polling company
 Fórsa, the largest public service union in Ireland